United News or UA together is a joint information telethon which was launched on February 24, 2022, at the start of Russia's 2022 invasion of Ukraine. It began broadcasting at the start of the invasion on February 24, 2022, as #UAtogether and broadcast on Rada TV, the official television channel of the Verkhovna Rada.

Since February 26, 2022, television channels owned by four Ukrainian media groups, namely 1+1 Media Group, Starlight Media, Inter Media Group, Media Group Ukraine (until July 22, 2022) and My-Ukraina (since November 8, 2022), as well as public television channel Pershyi and Rada TV continued to broadcast around the clock to bring verified information to the public regarding the war. Each channel forms its own slot lasting 6 hours.

History 

At the initiative of the Minister of Culture and Information Policy of Ukraine Oleksandr Tkachenko on February 16, 2022, a telethon was held on all TV channels of Ukraine on the topic of unity from 8:00 to 10:00 and from 19:00 to 22:00. A single information platform for strategic communication UA together was created at the request of the Cabinet of Ministers of Ukraine to ensure daily informing the public about the security situation and the activities of state bodies.

Since the beginning of Russia's attack on Ukraine on February 24, at 6:30 am, all platforms of Suspilne, Ukraine's national public broadcaster, worked in the mode of an information marathon and all of the broadcaster's television channels (UA:First, UA:Kultura and all of its regional channels) was regulated by the government and their feed was temporarily transferred to that of Rada TV. Since the imposition of martial law in Ukraine on the same day, TV channels 1+1, UA:First, Rada TV, ICTV, STB and Ukrayina 24 have been broadcasting alternately, despite the hostilities, while in the studio or in bomb shelters. 

On February 25, the StarLightMedia-owned Novyi Kanal, which was listed as one of the initial participants of the telethon, instead dedicated all of its airtime to airing children's movies and cartoons. They were followed by the 1+1 Media Group-owned TET, and the Media Group Ukraine-owned NLO TV. On the same day, Suspilne resumed live broadcasts, although these broadcasts were only available through Facebook and YouTube. All digital television channels in Ukraine carried UA:First's signal until February 26.

On February 26 at 9:20 a.m., Suspilne resumed broadcasting on television with its own marathon titled "Together we will win" («Разом переможемо»). Since February 28, Pershyi hosted its own telethon. Ukrainian Radio also runs a marathon using clippings from a telethon.

Free Media Holding-owned channels 5 Kanal and Priamyi kanal, as well as the internet television station Espreso TV broadcast their own alternative telethons.

On April 3, several networks, including 2+2, Enter-Film, Indigo TV, K1, Mega, NTN, and OCE, left the telethon and resumed their regular programming. They were followed by STB, which left the telethon on April 18. The channel's news team, however, continued to work in the telethon.

On July 22, television networks owned by Media Group Ukraine, including Ukrayina and Ukrayina 24, left the telethon after Rinat Akhmetov, the beneficial owner of Media Group Ukraine, returned the licenses of all media assets of the company to the state, causing all the networks owned by the company to stop broadcasting and for the company to halt its production of its assigned 6-hour slot in the telethon.

Production 
The participating Ukrainian media groups (1+1 Media Group, Inter Media Group, Rada TV, Starlight Media, Suspilne, My – Ukrayina and formerly, Media Group Ukraine) take turns in helming United News, with the news divisions of each media group working five hours a day and their order of handling the program scheduled four to five days in advance.

In addition to representatives from the Ministry of Culture and Information Policy, the Armed Forces of Ukraine, the National Security and Defense Council of Ukraine and the Office of the President of Ukraine, which co-operated in establishing the program, specialists from the participating media groups (which include journalists, cameramen, technicians, editors, information producers, etc.) co-operated with the production of the program. 1+1 Media Group's team is composed of people who work for their TSN news service program, 1+1's morning show  and five other information and entertainment projects from 1+1 and sister channel 2+2. However, Media Group Ukraine, whose team is made up of workers from its Ukrayina and Ukrayina 24 TV channels, broadcasts from its backup studios instead of the program's main studio complex in Kyiv due to the constant threat to the lives and health of their employees as air and missile strikes took place near the company's TV center.

1+1 and Rada TV alternately provide 24/7 signal redundancy, so that the program's studio can work even when an air raid siren is sounded nearby.

Rada TV also provided alternate feeds of the program in English and Russian through their YouTube channel. The program's live English and Russian interpretation is done by volunteers.

Broadcasters

In Ukraine 
As of March 28, about 30 Ukrainian TV channels (including 16 from the participating media groups), over-the-top (OTT) platforms, public and commercial radio stations broadcast United News, which provides maximum coverage in the country. Some of the OTT platforms that carry the program include 1+1 video, Kyivstar TV, MEGOGO, OLL.TV, Omega TV, Sweet.tv and YouTV.

Outside Ukraine 
In addition to broadcasting international versions of the participating media groups' flagship channels (such as 1+1 International, ICTV Ukraine and Inter+) on an open signal satellite, Ukrainian TV channels have granted the right for international broadcast providers to retransmit their signal outside Ukraine on their various platforms, including on Belsat (daylight retranslation), Delfi TV (night retranslation) and TVR3 (evening retranslation). In the first days of the marathon, more than 40 providers in Canada, the Czech Republic, Estonia, Latvia, Lithuania, Poland, the United Kingdom, and other countries have started airing United News.

References

External links 
 The official 24/7 live stream of the United News (simultaneous oral interpretation in Ukrainian into English)

Reactions to the 2022 Russian invasion of Ukraine
Television news in Ukraine
Telethons
Current affairs shows
Ukrainian-language television shows
2022 in Ukrainian television
Live television shows
Ukrainian television news shows